The Cadence Bank Houston Open is a professional golf tournament in Texas on the PGA Tour, played in November. As a part of a restructuring of the schedule, the event moved to the fall in 2019. Because the tour year starts the previous fall, the event was not a part of the 2019 PGA Tour, but was one of the first events of the 2020 PGA Tour. It is held at the Memorial Park Municipal Golf Course in Harris County near downtown Houston and the Galleria.

History
The event was played at several Houston venues until the 1970s, starting  at River Oaks Country Club in 1946 before moving to Memorial Park Golf Course in 1947 and, after a year off, moving again to Pine Forest Country Club in 1949 and BraeBurn Country Club in 1950. After this period of wandering, the tournament settled in at Memorial Park from 1951 through 1963. It was at Sharpstown Country Club in 1964 and 1965, moved to Champions Golf Club in 1966 for six years, and then to Westwood Country Club in 1972.

The tournament ventured outside of the city limits in 1973 and 1974 at Quail Valley Country Club in Missouri City, a southwest suburb. It relocated north to The Woodlands in 1975, at Woodlands Country Club until 1984, then at the TPC at The Woodlands through 2002. It moved to near Humble in 2003, where it stayed for 17 years; initially played at the Members Course, it changed to the Tournament Course in 2006. The facility was known as Redstone Golf Club until December 2013, and is now the Golf Club of Houston.

Previously held weeks later in mid-spring, the Houston Open was played the week before the Masters Tournament from 2007 through 2018 (except 2013, when it was two weeks before the Masters), and was the last chance to get into the field at Augusta through a win.  The tournament also had up to four additional sponsor exemptions to enable nonmember Masters-qualified professionals from the top 100 of the OWGR to compete in the U.S. in the week prior to the Masters.

Shell Oil Company sponsored the event from 1992 through 2017. When the end of Shell's sponsorship was announced, the PGA Tour said it would seek a new sponsor for 2018. At that time, Houston Astros owner Jim Crane led a group of new sponsors who signed a five-year deal with the PGA Tour to ensure that the event stayed in Houston. The tournament is now operated under the Astros Foundation, under the umbrella Astros Golf Foundation, with a new logo inspired by the Astros' "Rainbow Guts" uniforms of the 1980s.

In 2019, the event moved to October (as part of the 2019–20 season) and was the last event held at the Golf Club of Houston. In 2020, it moved to the renovated Memorial Park Golf Course. The Astros Foundation committed $34 million to renovate and redesign the golf course facilities with input from golfer Brooks Koepka. Due to the COVID-19 pandemic, the PGA Tour announced schedule changes to the 2020–21 season schedule and moved the Houston Open to November 5–8, one week before the Masters Tournament. The tournament was sponsored by Vivint.

The 2021 event was sponsored by Hewlett Packard Enterprise.

The 2022 event is sponsored by Cadence Bank.

Winners

Note: Green highlight indicates scoring records.
Sources:

Multiple winners
Nine men have won this tournament more than once through 2020.
3 wins
Curtis Strange: 1980, 1986, 1988
Vijay Singh: 2002, 2004, 2005
2 wins
Cary Middlecoff: 1950, 1953
Jack Burke Jr.: 1952, 1959
Mike Souchak: 1955, 1964
Bobby Nichols: 1962, 1965
Arnold Palmer: 1957, 1966
Bruce Crampton: 1973, 1975
Stuart Appleby: 1999, 2006

See also
Houston Open (early PGA Tour), an earlier Houston event recognized by the PGA Tour

Notes

References

External links

Coverage on the PGA Tour's official site

PGA Tour events
Golf in Houston
Sports competitions in Houston
Recurring sporting events established in 1946
1946 establishments in Texas